Ram Narayan Goswami (died 9 February 2010 in Bardhaman) was an Indian communist politician and peasant leader. Goswami was a Central Committee member of the Communist Party of India (Marxist). He was a minister in the West Bengal state government 1982–1983.

Goswami became active in the peasant movement in West Bengal, led various campaigns and was jailed for his political activism.

He was the assistant of Hare Krishna Konar while konar was the minister of land and land reforms. Goswami was elected general secretary of the All India Kisan Sabha in 1989 and 1992. He had also been elected president of the West Bengal State Kisan Sabha two times.

He was elected twice to the West Bengal Legislative Assembly (1977 and 1982), and three times to the Rajya Sabha (the upper house of the Indian parliament).

References

Communist Party of India (Marxist) politicians from West Bengal
Rajya Sabha members from West Bengal
2010 deaths
People from Purba Bardhaman district
Year of birth missing
State cabinet ministers of West Bengal